Ellen: The Ellen Pakkies Story is a South African drama film, directed by Daryne Joshua. Based on true events, the film tells a story of the damaged relationship between a woman and her son, who is addicted to drug abuse. It also narrates the itenary of events that led to the murder of her son, as well as the legal process that followed afterwards. It received multiple nominations at the 15th Africa Movie Academy Awards.

Cast
 Jill Levenberg as Ellen
 Jarrid Geduld as Abie
 Elton Landrew
 Clint Brink
 Ilse Klink

Production
Director Daryne Joshua initially didn't want to accept the role considering the sensitivity of the story. But after a personal encounter with Ellen Pakkies (the real person on whom the title character was based), he decided to go ahead with the project.

Release 
The film was released in South Africa on 7 September 2018.

Reception

Critical reception
In his review, Peter Feldman for The Citizen praised the lead characters, as well as the script and production. Describing it as one of South Africa's best films in recent times, he gave it a 4/5 overall rating. Likewise, DRM.am gave it a four-star rating, with much of its praise going for the underlying message in the film. It read that the film "...is a constant reminder how easy it is to judge somebody without really knowing the reasons behind the facts." Giles Grifin for Life Righting Collective recounted from the theme of the film how the society have failed to adequately protect persons living with addicts or even the addict themselves. Daily Maverick suggested that the execution of the film was so special that it should be celebrated even outside of South Africa. It received a 8/10 excellent rating from Spling Movies, who applauded the "soundtrack, raw honesty and confessional drama" of the film. It also got acclaim for the social responsibility message, and was recommended as a model for other movies.

Accolades
The film was screened at Rotterdam international Film Festival, as well as Seattle International Film Festival. It won three awards including category for best actress, best actor and best scriptwriter at kykNET Silwerskerm Festival.

References

External links
 

2018 films
2018 drama films
Afrikaans-language films
South African drama films